The 2015–16 Indiana State Sycamores basketball team represented Indiana State University during the 2015–16 NCAA Division I men's basketball season. The Sycamores, led by sixth year head coach Greg Lansing, played their home games at the Hulman Center and were members of the Missouri Valley Conference. They finished the season 15–17, 8–10 in Missouri Valley play to finish in a tie for sixth place. They defeated Illinois State in the quarterfinals of the Missouri Valley tournament to advance to the semifinals where they lost to Evansville.

Previous season 
The Sycamores finished the season 15–16, 11–7 in MVC play to finish in a tie for third place. They lost in the quarterfinals of the Missouri Valley tournament to Loyola–Chicago.

Departures

Incoming Transfers

Recruiting

Roster

Schedule

|-
!colspan=9 style="background:#0F4D92; color:#FFFFFF;"| Exhibition

|-
!colspan=9 style="background:#0F4D92; color:#FFFFFF;"| Non-conference regular season

|-
!colspan=9 style="background:#0F4D92; color:#FFFFFF;"| Missouri Valley Conference regular season

|-
!colspan=9 style="background:#0F4D92; color:#FFFFFF;"| Missouri Valley tournament

References

Indiana State Sycamores men's basketball seasons
Indiana State
2015 in sports in Indiana
2016 in sports in Indiana